Songbird is the twentieth studio album by Barbra Streisand, released in 1978. The title track reached number 25 on the Hot 100 and spent two weeks atop the adult contemporary chart. The album also includes Streisand's solo version of "You Don't Bring Me Flowers". She also subsequently re-recorded the song as a duet with Neil Diamond and this version topped the Billboard Hot 100 chart for two non-consecutive weeks in December 1978.

In the United States the album has been certified Platinum for sales of 1,000,000 copies. Streisand received the award at a convention held by CBS, in Los Angeles.

Track listing 
 "Tomorrow" (Charles Strouse, Martin Charnin) – 2:56
 "A Man I Loved" (Nikki Oosterveen, George Michalski) – 4:02
 "I Don't Break Easily" (Bruce Roberts) – 3:53
 "Love Breakdown" (Alan Gordon) – 3:36
 "You Don't Bring Me Flowers" (Neil Diamond, Alan Bergman, Marilyn Bergman) – 3:58
 "Honey Can I Put on Your Clothes" (Jean Monte Ray, Jerry Leiber, Mike Stoller) – 5:24
 "One More Night" (Stephen Bishop) – 3:10
 "Stay Away" (Kim Carnes) – 3:47
 "Deep in the Night" (Helen Miller, Eve Merriam) – 3:10
 "Songbird" (Dave Wolfert, Stephen Nelson) – 3:46

Personnel 
Barbra Streisand – vocals, back cover photography
Jay Graydon, Steve Lukather, Dennis Budimir, Lee Ritenour, Mitch Holder, Charlie Brown, Sal DiTroia, Larry Carlton, John Tropea – guitar
David Hungate, Will Lee, Abraham Laboriel, Reinie Press – bass guitar
Larry Muhoberac, David Foster, Lincoln Mayorga, Greg Mathieson – piano
Leon Pendarvis, Pat Rebillot – keyboards
Ian Underwood, James Newton Howard – synthesizer
Allan Schwartzberg - drums, percussion
Ed Greene, Jeff Porcaro – drums
Bob Zimmitti, Paulinho da Costa – percussion
Gayle Levant – harp
Ronny Lang – alto saxophone, soprano saxophone
Jim Horn – alto saxophone, flute, tenor saxophone 
Ernie Watts – alto saxophone, flute, tenor saxophone 
Larry Williams – saxophone
Jerry Hey, Steve Madaio – trumpet
Bill Reichenbach – trombone
Louise Di Tullio – flute
George Michalski, Niki Oosterveen, Jim Gilstrap, Julia Tillman Waters, Maxine Willard Waters, Oren Waters, Stephanie Spruill – backing vocals
Technical
Charles Koppelman – executive producer
Armin Steiner – engineer, remixing 
Nick DeCaro, James Newton Howard, Lee Holdridge, Gene Page – orchestral arrangements
Steve Schapiro – front cover photography

Charts

Certifications and sales 

}
}
}
}

References 

1978 albums
Barbra Streisand albums
Albums arranged by Lee Holdridge
Albums arranged by Gene Page
Albums produced by Gary Klein (producer)
Columbia Records albums